Ben Charles Edwards is a British film director, producer and writer. Edwards began his career working as a photographer.  Upon the release of Edwards' feature debut, The British Film Institute remarked that "Charles Edwards’ has crafted distinctive, admirable work that seems to have emerged from the unseen margins of British cinema."

Feature films

Most recently Edwards created and directed ’The Wheels of Heaven’, starring Mickey Rourke, Gary Stretch and Geoff Bell. Principal photography took place in Los Angeles, London and Bulgaria.  The story tells of a troubled young girl, Iva, who meets a charming older boy who gives her the strength to stand up and find her own path in life. But is the boy, as he claims, the fallen angel Lucifer sent to guide Iva in her destiny to save the human race? Or is he a delusional and dangerous young man?  When speaking to Deadline, Edwards remarked “The Wheels of Heaven is a tense thriller and at times a touching coming-of-age story; a love letter to the Devil, I wanted to pay heed to the ultimate fictional text of Mark Twain’s The Mysterious Stranger, with both pieces examining the ambiguity of ‘good’ and ‘evil’, and exploring how these concepts relate to life as it’s actually lived and the delicate balance between them. To quote the movie, ‘there is darkness in the most virtuous and light in the corrupt’.”     

2021 saw Edwards produce the feature film A Bird Flew In (originally titled Alone). Edward's production became the first UK film to start shooting since the 2020 COVID-19 pandemic took hold.  A Bird Flew In is a black and white Cinéma vérité inspired feature film. Starring Sir Derek Jacobi, Jeff Fahey, Camilla Rutherford, Michael Winder, Morgana Robinson and Frances Barber. The film was written by Edwards' longtime writing partner Dominic Wells and directed by Kirsty Bell in her directorial debut. The story was conceived in the first week of lockdown and written in short order throughout confinement, the black and white film charts six interlinked narratives. The film is set in the UK and France and was nominated for 'Best UK Feature Film' at the 2021 Raindance Film Festival where it opened in its hometown of London.

In early 2020 Edwards produced the feature documentary Quant. An insightful look into Mary Quant, One of the UK's most renowned cultural figures, Quant was at the vanguard of the stylistic revolution of the 1960s and 1970s, leading the charge away from convention and conservatism through the championing of ground-breaking designs including the miniskirt and hot pants, the film was directed by Edwards' longstanding collaborator Sadie Frost. Quant premiered within the official selection of The BFI London Film Festival 2021 before its UK theatrical release  

2019 saw Edwards' write and direct  Father of Flies, a psychological horror set in Suffern upstate New York. Filming took place in New York and London. The movie stars Camilla Rutherford in a leading role. The film was based on a story Edwards had written as a child. Other members of the cast include Davi Santos, Page Ruth and the late Nicholas Tucci. The original score for the movie was created by Orri Páll Dýrason of Sigur Rós. Filming began in January 2018, with the film dedicated to the memory of actor Nicholas Tucci and set for release in 2022.
To date, Father of Flies has been awarded 'Best Feature Film' at Buenos Aires International Film Festival 2022. The film was also awarded at Paris International Film Festival for 'Best Score' and 'Best Sound Design'. 

In 2016 Edwards directed his motion picture debut Set the Thames on Fire.  Set the Thames on Fire is a fantasy film, directed by Ben Charles Edwards and written by Al Joshua. The dark comedy stars Michael Winder and Max Bennet as Art & Sal, two boys who fall through the clockwork of a grotesque, nightmare London, endeavouring to survive and escape, and perhaps find hope. The cast also includes Noel Fielding, David Hoyle, Sally Phillips, and Lily Loveless. To date, Set The Thames on Fire has been nominated for "The Discovery Award" for Best New Debut Film at the BFI London Comedy Film Festival 2016. The film was also long listed for the British Independent Film Awards 2016 for "Outstanding Achievement In Craft" and "Newcomer Discovery Award".

Other works include the award-winning film Will Nature Make a Man of Me Yet?. Additionally entitled Motel Monologues. The film is a series of monologues originally written or intended to be performed for or by men only. However within the film these monologues are  recited back to back by a full female cast. Set in a custom built Motel designed by Edwards and production designer James Hatt'. The film was exhibited at the Pompidou Centre Paris. Edwards was nominated for 'Best Director' at Bokeh film festival. The film was also nominated for 'Best Picture'.

Short films

In early 2013 Edwards directed Dotty, co-written with Dominic Wells. The film was produced by Blonde to Black Pictures and Ben Charles Edwards. Sadie Frost won "Best Actress" at the Hollywood Independent Film Festival for her portrayal of the title character. The film was also selected for a further 18 international film festivals and received its European Premiere at Raindance Film Festival 2014 in its hometown of London.

In early 2012, Ben created "Suzie Lovitt", a 10-minute short starring eight-year-old Rudy Law (son of Sadie Frost and Jude Law). The film was written by Edwards and Dominic Wells. "Suzie Lovitt" has only been screened once for a private event in Leicester Square in early 2012.

In 2011, Edwards directed and co-wrote Animal Charm, starring Boy George, Michael Urie, Sally Phillips, Sadie Frost and Emily Beecham.

Edwards' first short film, A musical entitled The Town That Boars Me (2008), a series of short films entitled "A Picture Book Of London Town", and Giles (a study of Giles Deacon) for Vogue Italia.

References

English film directors
Horror film directors
Film people from London
Year of birth missing (living people)
Living people
Place of birth missing (living people)